The Len Foote Hike Inn is a  sustainably designed  and LEED-certified ecotourism facility located near the peak of Frosty Mountain in the Chattahoochee National Forest in Dawson County, Georgia, USA.   The lodge is open year-round and is only accessible via hiking trails. Twenty rooms, a two-story central lobby, a dining room, a bathhouse, toilets, and a common room comprise the facility.

The Georgia Department of Natural Resources owns the Hike Inn, and the inn is operated by the non-profit Len Foote Hike Inn, Inc. - an affiliate of the Georgia Appalachian Trail Club.

The inn opened in November 1998 and sits at an altitude of 3,100 feet. The surrounding area contains mountain laurel, rhododendron, and oak and hickory trees. Conservation, environmental stewardship and environmental education are stressed at the inn. The facility contains solar-powered hot showers, photo-voltaic solar energy and compostable, odorless toilets. Communal breakfast and dinner meals are included with the stay and are served family-style. Visitors are encouraged to minimize their food waste during meals, and leftover food is composted via a vermiculture program.

The Hike Inn can only be reached by foot.  The approach trail to the inn from the south starts at Amicalola Falls State Park in Dawson County, Georgia and requires a five-mile hike.  The first .35 miles of this trail to the inn is also part of the approach trail to Springer Mountain, the southern terminus of the Appalachian Trail (AT). Thru-hikers for the AT often start or end their journey at the Hike Inn. The trail to the Inn continues northward past the facility for approximately one-mile to reconnect to the AT approach trail. The trail from Amicalola Falls to the Hike Inn is marked with lime green paint blazes. The rise in elevation during this hike is 500 feet and is listed on park literature and signage as an "easy to moderate" hike.

Also located on the grounds of the inn is a granite celestial calendar formation that aligns with the rising sun during the spring and fall equinoxes. The Star Base was designed by Fernbank Science Center in nearby Atlanta .

See also

Amicalola Falls State Park
Springer Mountain
Chattahoochee National Forest
Appalachian Trail

References

External links
Georgia State Parks-Amicalola Falls
Hike Inn: Backcountry Lodging via a Beautiful Hike

Appalachian Trail
Appalachian Mountains
Blue Ridge Mountains
Chattahoochee-Oconee National Forest
Education in Dawson County, Georgia
Buildings and structures in Dawson County, Georgia
Tourist attractions in Georgia (U.S. state)
Wildlife rehabilitation and conservation centers
State parks of Georgia (U.S. state)
Protected areas of Dawson County, Georgia
Protected areas established in 1998
Outdoor education organizations
Hiking in the United States
Ecotourism
Campgrounds in the United States
Mountain huts in the United States